Franklin County may refer to:

Australia
Franklin County, New South Wales 
the former name of Franklin Land District, Tasmania

New Zealand
Franklin County, New Zealand

United States
 Franklin County is the name of 24 counties and one parish in the United States, almost all named after Benjamin Franklin:
Franklin County, Alabama 
Franklin County, Arkansas 
Franklin County, Florida 
Franklin County, Georgia 
Franklin County, Idaho
Franklin County, Illinois 
Franklin County, Indiana 
Franklin County, Iowa 
Franklin County, Kansas 
Franklin County, Kentucky 
Franklin Parish, Louisiana 
Franklin County, Maine 
Franklin County, Massachusetts 
Franklin County, Mississippi 
Franklin County, Missouri 
Franklin County, Nebraska 
Franklin County, New York 
Franklin County, North Carolina 
Franklin County, Ohio 
Franklin County, Pennsylvania 
Franklin County, Tennessee 
Franklin County, Texas 
Franklin County, Vermont 
Franklin County, Virginia 
Franklin County, Washington

See also
Franklin (disambiguation)